Jovan or John the Serb may refer to:

Jovan the Serb of Kratovo (1526–1583), Serbian Orthodox priest and scribe
Jovan II, Patriarch of the Serbs (1592–1613)
Jovan Monasterlija (fl. 1683–1706), Austrian-Serbian commander of the Serbian Militia